The 1963 NCAA University Division baseball tournament was played at the end of the 1963 NCAA University Division baseball season to determine the national champion of college baseball.  The tournament concluded with eight teams competing in the College World Series, a double-elimination tournament in its seventeenth year.  Eight regional districts sent representatives to the College World Series with preliminary rounds within each district serving to determine each representative.  These events would later become known as regionals.  Each district had its own format for selecting teams, resulting in 23 teams participating in the tournament at the conclusion of their regular season, and in some cases, after a conference tournament.  The College World Series was held in Omaha, NE from June 11 to June 16.  The seventeenth tournament's champion was Southern California, coached by Rod Dedeaux.  The Most Outstanding Player was Bud Hollowell of Southern California.

Regionals
The opening rounds of the tournament were played across seven district sites across the country, each consisting of a field of two to four teams. Each district tournament, except District 2, was double-elimination. The winners of each district advanced to the College World Series.

Bold indicates winner.  * indicates extra innings.

District 1
Holy Cross vs. Boston College was played at Newton, Massachusetts and Connecticut vs. Providence and Providence vs. Holy Cross were played at Worcester, Massachusetts.

* Indicates game required 10 innings.

District 2 at Princeton, NJ

District 3 at Gastonia, NC

District 4 at Champaign, IL

District 5 at Columbia, MO

District 6
Texas automatically qualified for the College World Series out of District 6.

District 7 at Tucson, AZ

District 8 at Corvallis, OR

College World Series

Participants

Results

Bracket

Game results

All-Tournament Team
The following players were members of the All-Tournament Team.

Notable players
 Arizona: Ron Theobald, Bart Zeller
 Florida State: Ken Suarez
 Holy Cross: Dick Joyce, John Peterman
 Missouri: John Sevcik
 Penn State:
 Southern California: Gary Holman, Rene Lachemann
 Texas: Bill Bethea, Chuck Hartenstein
 Western Michigan: Greg Bollo

See also
 1963 NAIA World Series

References

NCAA Division I Baseball Championship
Tournament